Rizhao, alternatively romanized as Jihchao, is a prefecture-level city in southeastern Shandong province, China. It is situated on the coastline along the Yellow Sea, and features a major seaport, the Port of Rizhao. It borders Qingdao to the northeast, Weifang to the north, Linyi to the west and southwest, and faces Korea and Japan across the Yellow Sea to the east.

The name of the city literally means "sunshine". The city is known for its sustainability, and it mandates solar-water heaters in all new buildings. Rizhao city was recognized by the United Nations as one of the most habitable cities in the world in 2009.

The city population stands at 2,968,365 people as of the 2020 Chinese census, of whom 1,172,205 live in the urban area of Donggang District.

History
Rizhao is located at the place where the ancient Dawenkou culture and the Longshan culture flourished. Rizhao belonged to the Dongyi people during the Xia and Shang dynasties (2070-1046 BC), and to Ju and Yue States in the Spring and Autumn period (770-476 BC) and the Warring States period (476-221 BC). It became a part of Langye Commandery in the Qin dynasty (221-206 BC). Rizhao was named Haiqu County during the Western Han (206 BC-25 AD) and Xihai County under the Eastern Han (25-220 AD).

During the Tang dynasty, together with Ju County, Rizhao belonged to Mi Prefecture of Henan Prefecture. In the second year of the Yuanyou Period of the Song dynasty, Rizhao Township was established, with the name meaning "(the first to get) sunshine". In the 24th year of the Dading Period of the Jin dynasty, Rizhao County was established. In 1940 it came under the control of the Communist Party of China. After being a county and since 1985 a city under the administration of Linyi, Rizhao became a prefecture-level city within Shandong province in 1989.

The Field Museum of Natural History in Chicago has done field survey archaeological work in Rizhao over the years.

Climate
Rizhao has a temperate, four-season, monsoon-influenced climate that lies in the transition between the humid subtropical (Köppen Cwa) and humid continental (Köppen Dwa) regimes, but favoring the former. Due to its proximity to the coast and being on a peninsula, it experiences a one-month delayed spring compared to much of the province. Conversely, fall is milder than inland areas in Shandong. On average, there are 2,530 hours of bright sunshine annually, and the relative humidity is 70–74 %.

Administration

The prefecture-level city of Rizhao administers four county-level divisions, including two districts and two counties.

Donggang District
Lanshan District
Ju County
Wulian County

Landmarks and tourist attractions
The following locations have a 4-star rating according to Chinese classification for scenic spots

 Wulian Mountain 
 Fulai Mountain
 Daqing Mountain
 Wanpingkou Beach
 Rizhao Beach National Park
 Longmengu
 Liujiawan Park

Sustainable development
The city now mandates the incorporation of solar panels in all new buildings, and oversees the construction process to ensure the panels are correctly installed. The effort to install solar water heaters began in 1992.

Transportation

The seaport serves as a site for loading and unloading iron ore and coal. Other products passing through the harbor include cement, nickel, bauxite, and the like. In 2011 the Port of Rizhao, together with the cities of Qingdao, Weihai and Yantai in Shandong, signed a strategic alliance with Busan, the largest port of the Republic of Korea. The alliance aims at building a shipping and logistics center in Northeast Asia. The new iron ore port of Lanqiao is located close to it as is the Lanshan port region.

Rizhao Shanzihe Airport (IATA: RIZ) is an airport serving the city of Rizhao. The airport received approval from the State Council and the Central Military Commission in October 2013. It was opened on 22 December 2015.

The city is served by two railway stations, Rizhao railway station for local trains and Rizhao West railway station for both local and high-speed services.

Education

Universities and colleges
Since becoming a city, Rizhao has seen a significant growth in the number of universities and colleges, 

 Qufu Normal University
 Jining Medical University
 Rizhao Polytechnic 
 Shandong Foreign Languages Vocational College
 Shandong Maritime Vocational College
 Shandong Sport College
 Shandong Water Polytechnic

Image gallery

International relations
Rizhao  twin towns and sister cities are:

  Türkmenabat, Türkmenistan (2014)

References

External links

Government website of Rizhao (in Chinese), retrieved on 2012-10-11

 
Cities in Shandong
Prefecture-level divisions of Shandong